Coagh United Football Club is an intermediate, Northern Irish football club playing in the Ballymena & Provincial Intermediate League. The club, founded in 1970, hails from Coagh, near Cookstown, County Tyrone. They play their home games at Hagan Park.

In 2016 the club was relegated from the Northern Ireland Football League.

The club is noted for being the first club of Leeds United and Northern Ireland player Stuart Dallas, he played for the club between 2007 and 2010, when he left to join Premiership side Crusaders.

Honours

Intermediate honours
IFA Intermediate League Second Division/IFA Championship 2: 2
2003–04, 2011–12
Bob Radcliffe Cup: 2
1988–89, 2006–07
Border Cup: 1
1995–96
Ballymena & Provincial Football League: 1
2016-17
McReynolds Cup: 1 **2021-2022

External links
Coagh United website

Association football clubs established in 1970
Association football clubs in Northern Ireland
Association football clubs in County Tyrone
1970 establishments in Northern Ireland
Cookstown